Peter Mochrie (born 23 March 1959), is an Australian actor whose career spans over forty years in the industry, primarily featuring in television soap opera's, he has also worked in New Zealand, where he spent six years as Dr. Callum McKay in the TV serial Shortland Street.

Biography
Mochrie born in March 1959, love of acting started at the age of 13 when he appeared in a play at Knox Grammar School, where he completed his schooling in 1976. He is also a producer of Fine Films and Profiles, presenter, teacher of 'The Art of Presenting on Camera' and an auctioneer for McGrath Estate Agents.

In 1978, he received his first big break appearing in TV soap opera The Restless Years as Ric Moran. He played this role for two years and soon caught the attention of other TV producers, and appearing in serials including Holiday Island, Neighbours, Butterfly Island, and Sons And Daughters, and Alex Buzo’s made-for-TV film Rooted for the Australian Broadcasting Corporation (ABC). He also appeared in two movies, Winter of Our Dreams and Just in Time and on stage in The Shifting Heart, The Shrew, Maids of the Mill, The Bear and Fool for Love.

In 1987, Mochrie was accepted into the National Institute of Dramatic Art (NIDA). After graduation, he had roles in shows such as Home and Away, G.P., Time Trax, The Resting Place and Blue Heelers

He played John ‘Knocker’ Harrison in Water Rats, the male lead Steve Hayden in Murder Call, Mark Kelman in Mighty Morphin Power Rangers: The Movie, Michael Allen in Frauds, Bill Albright in The Cooks and Rick Fontaine in the award winning children’s series, Cybergirl.

Mochrie co-founded the Roar Theatre Company (NSW) and for ten years he was a regular tutor at NIDA as well as appearing in plays such as Spinning Into Butter at the Ensemble, Pesthouse for The NIDA Company and directing Stuck Love at the Newtown Theatre (NSW). He also produced and co-wrote the short films Check Out and Film Lovers.

In July 2006, Mochrie accepted the offer to play Dr. Callum McKay on the New Zealand television series Shortland Street which he played for six years, appearing in 637 episodes.  He had previously travelled to Auckland three years earlier to film  Lucy; the story of Lucille Ball for CBS .

In 2010, Mochrie played Vernon Bramwell in the New Zealand film, Predicament, and Officer Eastwood in the Bollywood film, Love Has No Language. He has also done voice-over work on both sides of the Tasman, as well as more recently, Los Angeles.
Upon returning to Australia in 2013, he appeared as Geoff Hadley in Janet King for the ABC and started 2014 playing Fraser Collins in In Your Dreams for Southern Star. His role as Sam Dovinic in The Health and Safety of All helped the film win the Silver Medal at the 2015 New York Festival. Mochrie returned to the Ensemble Theatre in early 2016 to play Carl Kretzmer in David Williamson's Jack of Hearts and to television with roles in both the miniseries House of Bond on the Nine Network and Blue Murder: Killer Cop for Channel 7. He also reprised the role of Geoff Hadley in  season 3 of Janet King for the ABC.

Acting teacher
Since 1997 Mochrie has been teaching "Introduction to Screen Acting" for NIDA's Open Program. He is also a regular tutor of acting & presentation skills. He has taught his course 'The Art of Presenting on Camera' at the Sydney Drama School, the Australian Institute of Performing Arts, McGrath Estate Agents, Laing & Simmons, Raine & Horne, Screenwise, The University of N.S.W. and the Actors Centre Australia.

Personal life
Born in Sydney, Australia, he married for the first time in 2010 at the age of 50. His spouse is Sally Jane Mochrie, and they have a son, Cade.

Filmography

References

External links

Australian male film actors
Australian male stage actors
Australian male television actors
People educated at Knox Grammar School
1959 births
Living people